Hyppa is a genus of moths in the family Noctuidae.

Species
 Hyppa brunneicrista Smith, 1902
 Hyppa contrasta McDunnough, 1946
 Hyppa indistincta Smith, 1894
 Hyppa potamus J.T. Troubridge & Lafontaine, 2004
 Hyppa rectilinea Esper, 1788
 Hyppa xylinoides Guenée in Boisduval & Guenée, 1852 (syn: Hyppa ancocisconensis Morrison, 1875)

References

Caradrinini